In sports, an open is a sporting event or game tournament that is typically open to contestants of all countries regardless of their professional or amateur status, age, ability, gender, sex, or other categorization. In many sports, preliminary qualifying events, open to all entrants, are held to successively reduce the field to a manageable number for participation in a final championship event, which itself may involve elimination rounds (tournaments).

The term open may not be absolute. For example, in the U.S. Open in golf, entrants at qualifying events must have a USGA official handicap of 1.4 or less. Other minimum performance standards or eligibility criteria may apply in other sports.

Opens tournament are played in golf, tennis, bowling, badminton, Brazilian jiu-jitsu, quizbowl, fighting games, snooker, darts, volleyball, ultimate, squash, CrossFit, Chess, and pickleball.

Sports terminology